Yoshimatsu Sakaibara (born 10 October 1931) is a Japanese sailor. He competed in the Star event at the 1960 Summer Olympics.

References

External links
 

1931 births
Possibly living people
Japanese male sailors (sport)
Olympic sailors of Japan
Sailors at the 1960 Summer Olympics – Star
Sportspeople from Kanagawa Prefecture